SS Jasper Park was a Park ship freighter, built in 1942. She was completed on 24 September 1942, by the company Davie Shipbuilding in Lauzon, Quebec. Her hull number is 537. Davie Shipbuilding is now called Chantier Davie Canada Inc. The ship was owned by the Park Steamship Company, which was owned by Canada's Federal government. The government had built 400 vessels during World War II. Built as a merchant steamship constructed for Canada’s Merchant Navy in 1942. She was named after Jasper National Park in the Canadian Rockies in the province of Alberta, Canada.

She was operated for the Government by Canada Shipping Company.

World War II
Jasper Park was part of Convoy ON 154. The ships departed Liverpool on 18 December 1942 and were met by the Royal Canadian Navy Mid-Ocean Escort Force Group C-1. The convoy sailed in twelve columns of three or four ships each. Of the 55 cargo freighters 13 were sunk on the trip, Jasper Park survived. Jasper Park and remainder of the convoy reached New York City on 12 January 1943.

Jasper Park was on voyage from Calcutta and Cochin, India unescorted to Saint John, New Brunswick via Durban, South Africa with 6,500 tons of general cargo including jute and tea. Jasper Park was hit by two or three torpedoes from U-177. She sank in the Indian Ocean, south of Durban.

The Germans questioned the Jasper Park survivors they found in two lifeboats, then departed. Jasper Park had a crew of 55. Four men were lost in the sinking. The crew were taken to Durban.

The lost are remembered in the Royal Canadian Naval Ships Memorial Monument in Spencer Smith Park in Burlington, Ontario.

See also
 Allied technological cooperation during World War II
 Empire ships
 List of Liberty ships

References

1942 ships
Maritime history of Canada
World War II merchant ships of Canada
Steamships of Canada
Canadian Merchant Navy
Naval history of Canada
Fleet of the Canadian Merchant Navy
Ships sunk by German submarines in World War II
World War II shipwrecks in the Indian Ocean